Zielna (literally "related to weeds or herbs", "herbal") is a street in Warsaw city centre, Poland. Initially one of the main streets linking the southern city centre with its northern part, it lost much of its significance in 1941, when the nearby Marszałkowska street had been extended across the Saxon Garden to the Bankowy Sq. During the Warsaw Uprising of 1944 heavy fighting took place for the PAST skyscraper located at Zielna 37. The building was taken by the Polish forces in the effect of heavy fights. After the Uprising most of the street had been completely demolished. After the war only the two buildings of the PAST company had been rebuilt, while the rest of the ruins were removed. Currently there are plans to fill the empty space between Zielna and Marszałkowska with new houses, which however is still disputed.

References

Streets in Warsaw